Fran Krsto Frankopan (4 March 1643 – 30 April 1671) was a Croatian baroque poet, nobleman and politician. He is remembered primarily for his involvement in the failed Zrinski-Frankopan conspiracy. He was a Croatian marquess, a member of the Frankopan noble family and its last male descendant.

Biography

Early life and poetry

Born in Bosiljevo, Croatia, twenty years younger than his brothers, Fran Krsto Frankopan was an authentic poet in his own right. Following the death of his father, Vuk Krsto Frankopan, he was sent to be schooled in Zagreb, where he enrolled at the Jesuit academy. He lived at today's Habdelić street in the Upper Town, before continuing his education in Italy. There he published his first poetic work in Latin language, Elegia, at age of only 13, in 1656. He underwent various poetic influences, none of which was able to deafen his own inspiration. In such a vein was written his The Garden in which to Cheat Time (Gartlic za čas kratiti), a personal account of the poet's experiences while in prison.

Living in an area bordering on several Croatian dialects, Frankopan mainly wrote his poetry in the Kajkavian-ikavian dialect of the Croatian language (as seen in his poem Srića daje kaj misal ne zgaje). In prison, Frankopan translated Molière's Georges Dandin, the first translation to Slovenian and any Slavic language.

Along with Petar Zrinski, his brother Nikola, Frankopan and his sister Katarina (Petar's wife), contributed various works of poetry and prose to 17th century Croatian literature.

Peace of Vasvár
Both Frankopan and his brother-in-law Ban (viceroy) Petar Zrinski were described as competent statesmen and prolific writers. They have seen successes in negotiating and liberating the ethnic Hungarian and Croatian areas occupied by the waning Ottoman Empire. However, the Viennese military council, wishing to curb the Hungarian influence in the Monarchy, decided to ultimately sign a peace treaty with the Ottomans, by which the liberated territories had to be ceded back to the Ottoman Empire. Hungarian and Croatian nobles saw the resulting peace treaty, the Peace of Vasvár, as utterly unfavourable and disgraceful to their interests. In response, Frankopan and Zrinski decided to raise a rebel against the king, Leopold I.

Death

Frankopan and Zrinski were seized by the Royal guard while in Vienna. As a punishment for sedition, they were sentenced to be executed in Wiener Neustadt in 1671.

The deaths of Zrinski and Frankopan caused an outrage among Croatian nobles. Zrinski and Frankopan did not even try to answer the court in Vienna on the terms in which Vienna dealt with them, but rather wished to counteract its injustices with what was then a quite justifiable diplomacy. Viennese officials later recognized that the main reason for the rebellion was the dissatisfaction among Hungarians and Croats prompted by the unfavorable Peace of Vasvár, rather than unprovoked sedition.

The remains of Fran Krsto Frankopan and Petar Zrinski were handed over to the Croatian authorities and buried in the Cathedral of Zagreb in 1919, following World War I.

List of works
From the following list only Elegia was published during Frankopan's lifetime, the rest was found in manuscript following his execution at Wiener Neustadt.

Lyric
 Elegia (1656), written in Latin
 Gartlic za čas kratiti, completed c. 1671
 Various pious poems
 Zganke za vrime kratiti
 Sentencije vsakojaške

Prose
 Trumbita sudnjega dneva
 Preljubljeno zlato i izabranice moga srca

Drama
 Jarne bogati (translation from Moliere)

Legacy

The portraits of Frankopan and Zrinski are depicted on the obverse of the Croatian 5 kuna banknote, issued in 1993 and 2001.

His poems are still popular and are written in a combination of all three Croatian dialects: štokavian, kajkavian and čakavian. This type of writing was also regular for  other writers of the Craotian Baroque Ozalj Literary Circle: Ana Katarina Zrinski and Petar IV Zrinski.

Quotes

See also

 Zrinski-Frankopan conspiracy
 MT Frankopan

Esternal Links 

For the descendants of the Counts Frangipani or Frankopanovich or Francopanovich or Francopanovits of Dalmatia Croatia see:

 Friederich Heyer von Rosenfield (1873), "Counts Frangipani or Frankopanovich or Damiani di Vergada Gliubavaz Frangipani (Frankopan) Detrico", in: Wappenbuch: Der Adel des Königreichs Dalmatien, Volume 4, part 3 (in German). Nürnberg: Bauer und Raspe, p. 44.
 Friederich Heyer von Rosenfield (1873), "Counts Frangipani or Frankopanovich or Damiani di Vergada Gliubavaz Frangipani (Frankopan) Detrico", in: Wappenbuch: Der Adel des Königreichs Dalmatien, Volume 4, part 3 (in German). Nürnberg: Bauer und Raspe, p. 45.
 Friederich Heyer von Rosenfield (1873), "Coats of arms of Counts Frangipani or Frankopanovich or Damiani di Vergada Gliubavaz Frangipani (Frankopan) Detrico", in: Wappenbuch: Der Adel des Königreichs Dalmatien, Volume 4, part 3 (in German). Nürnberg: Bauer und Raspe, taf. 30.
 J. B. Rietstap (1884), "Coats of arms of Counts Frangipani or Gliubavaz Frangipani or Gliubavaz Frangipani Detrico or Damiani di Vergaada Gliubavaz Frangipani Detrico", in:  (in France). Gouda: G. B. vaan Goor Zonen, pp.703-704, p.786, p.507.
 Victor Anton Duisin (1938), "Counts Damjanić Vrgadski Frankopan Ljubavac Detrico", in: "Zbornik Plemstva" (in Croatian). Zagreb: Tisak Djela i Grbova, p. 155-156.
 "Counts Damjanić Vrgadski Frankopan Ljubavac Detrico" in: (in Croatian). Zagreb: on line.

References

External links
Poems, in Croatian

Frankopan family
Croatian nobility
17th-century Croatian poets
Croatian male poets
Croatian Roman Catholics
Burials at Zagreb Cathedral
1643 births
1671 deaths
17th-century Croatian people
Habsburg Croats
17th-century Croatian military personnel
Baroque writers
17th-century Croatian nobility
People executed by Austria
Executed Croatian people